Raimund Grübl (12 August 1847, Vienna – 12 May 1898, Vienna) was an Austrian lawyer and mayor of Vienna from 1894 to 1895. He is regarded as the last liberal mayor of the city.

Grübl attended to Akademisches Gymnasium in Vienna.

References 

1847 births
1898 deaths
Mayors of Vienna
University of Vienna alumni
Lawyers from Vienna